The Sunday Times is a weekly Sri Lankan broadsheet initially published by the now defunct Times Group, until 1991, when it was taken over by Wijeya Newspapers. The paper features articles of journalists such as defence columnist Iqbal Athas and Ameen Izzadeen. The daily counterpart of the Sri Lankan Sunday Times is the Daily Mirror.

History
The first Times newspaper, Ceylon Times was established in 1846. The Times of Ceylon Ltd, which existed for 131 years, was taken over by the Sri Lankan government in 1977. Ranjith Wijewardena, the son of D. R. Wijewardena, and the chairman of Wijeya Newspapers Ltd, purchased the company which was under liquidation, in 1986. However, the newspaper The Sunday Times came into being in 1991.

See also
List of newspapers in Sri Lanka

References

External links
 
 Daily Mirror official website
 Wijeya Newspapers Ltd. official website

English-language newspapers published in Sri Lanka
Publications established in 1991
Sunday newspapers published in Sri Lanka
Wijeya Newspapers